The canton of Avignon-Sud is a French former administrative division in the department of Vaucluse and region Provence-Alpes-Côte d'Azur. It had 19,306 inhabitants (2012). It was disbanded following the French canton reorganisation which came into effect in March 2015. It comprised part of the communes of Avignon.

References

Avignon-Sud
Avignon
2015 disestablishments in France
States and territories disestablished in 2015